SPCO is an abbreviation with multiple meanings, including:
carboxyhemoglobin saturation
Saint Paul Chamber Orchestra
Single pole, change over, a type of electrical switch